FC Brugg is a Swiss football club from the town of Brugg in Canton Aargau. The team currently plays in Liga 1., the 5th tier in the Swiss football pyramid. The club narrowly missed out on promotion to the Challenge League after losing a playoff match, on 24 May 2008, against SC Zofingen in Schötz.

Stadium
FC Brugg play their home games at Stadion Au. The capacity is 3,300 with 300 seats and 3,000 standing places.

External links
Official Website 
Soccerway.com profile 
Football.ch profile 

Football clubs in Switzerland
Association football clubs established in 1914
Brugg
1914 establishments in Switzerland